Thorgaut Island is the largest island in the northeast part of the Robinson Group, lying 7 nautical miles (13 km) northwest of Cape Daly, 4 nautical miles (7 km) east of Andersen Island, and 3 to 4 nautical miles (5 – 6 km) north-west of Kirton Island and Macklin Island, respectively, which are also part of the Robinson Group. Thorgaut island, and those near it, were sighted in 1931 by the crew of the Norwegian whale catcher names Thorgaut and Robinson, respectively, for the group. Having approved Robinson as the group name, Thorgaut Island has been approved for the most conspicuous of its features.

See also 
 List of Antarctic and sub-Antarctic islands

Islands of Mac. Robertson Land